Old Parish Church (also known as Muckle Kirk)  is a Category A listed building located on Maiden Street in Peterhead, Aberdeenshire, Scotland. Local brothers Robert and John Mitchell built the church between 1804 and 1806, to a design by Alexander Laing, of Edinburgh. Its Burgerhuys bell dates to 1647.

The church closed in 2016, and its congregation merged with Peterhead's Trinity Church to form Peterhead New Parish Church.

Gallery

See also
List of listed buildings in Peterhead, Aberdeenshire

References

External links
PETERHEAD OLD PARISH CHURCH - Historic Environment Scotland

Churches in Peterhead
Former churches in Scotland
Category A listed buildings in Aberdeenshire
Listed churches in Scotland
1806 establishments in Scotland